Probert is a patronymic name derived from the Welsh "ap Robert" meaning "son of Robert". It can refer to:

Andrew Probert (born 1946), film concept designer
Belinda Probert (born 1949), Australian social scientist
Bob Probert (1965-2010), Canadian ice hockey player
Matthew Probert, British creator of Probert Encyclopaedia 
Philomen Probert, British classicist
Tom Probert (born 1986), English cricketer

See also
Probert Encyclopaedia
Probert-Price Collection, private collection of clothing and accessories

Anglicised Welsh-language surnames
Surnames of Welsh origin
Patronymic surnames
Surnames from given names